Valeri Vladimirovich Kleymyonov (born 18 December 1975) is a former Russian football player.

References

1975 births
Living people
Soviet footballers
FC Tekstilshchik Kamyshin players
Russian footballers
Russian Premier League players
FC SKA Rostov-on-Don players
FC Energiya Volzhsky players
FC Lada-Tolyatti players
FC Mordovia Saransk players
FC Lokomotiv Nizhny Novgorod players
FC Orenburg players
Association football midfielders
Association football forwards